Aimar Sagastibelza Caballero (born 5 July 1984) is a Spanish professional footballer who plays for SD Amorebieta mainly as a central defender.

Club career
Born in Leitza, Navarre, Aimar made his debut as a senior with Tolosa CF in the 2005–06 season, in Tercera División. After a short stint at SD Beasain he joined Gimnàstic de Tarragona, initially being assigned to the farm team also in the fourth tier.

In the summer of 2008, Aimar was promoted to the Catalans' first team in the Segunda División. He played his first match as a professional on 22 November, featuring the last 11 minutes of a 1–1 away draw against Real Murcia.

Aimar terminated his contract with Nàstic on 16 September 2009, and signed with CD Teruel of the fourth division a day later. He appeared in 36 games and scored once in his first season, which ended in promotion.

On 28 June 2012, Aimar joined Segunda División B club SD Eibar. He featured sparingly for the side, who were promoted to the professional leagues after a four-year absence, and subsequently moved to Real Unión also in division three, where he was at one point part of one of the league's oldest squads.

On 27 August 2018, Aimar signed for third-tier Gernika Club. The 35-year-old agreed to a contract at SD Amorebieta in the same league and region the following July, helping in their first-ever promotion to the second division at the end of the 2020–21 campaign.

References

External links

1984 births
Living people
People from Norte de Aralar
Spanish footballers
Footballers from Navarre
Association football defenders
Segunda División players
Segunda División B players
Tercera División players
Tolosa CF footballers
SD Beasain footballers
CF Pobla de Mafumet footballers
Gimnàstic de Tarragona footballers
CD Teruel footballers
SD Eibar footballers
Real Unión footballers
Gernika Club footballers
SD Amorebieta footballers